Marc Alexander Newfield (born October 19, 1972) is an American former professional baseball player from  to  who played for the Seattle Mariners, San Diego Padres, and Milwaukee Brewers of Major League Baseball (MLB).

In 1996, he was one of three players traded from San Diego to Milwaukee for Greg Vaughn.

He played baseball for Marina High School in Huntington Beach, California.

External links

1972 births
Living people
African-American baseball players
American expatriate baseball players in Canada
Arizona League Mariners players
Baseball players from Sacramento, California
Calgary Cannons players
Jacksonville Suns players
Las Vegas Stars (baseball) players
Major League Baseball left fielders
Milwaukee Brewers players
San Diego Padres players
Seattle Mariners players
Tacoma Rainiers players
Trenton Thunder players
Tucson Toros players
Vancouver Canadians players
San Bernardino Spirit players
20th-century African-American sportspeople